Zhejiang Geely Holding Group Co., Ltd (ZGH), commonly known as Geely (吉利  "auspicious"), is a Chinese multinational automotive company headquartered in Hangzhou, Zhejiang. The company is privately held by Chinese billionaire entrepreneur Li Shufu. It was established in 1986 and entered the automotive industry in 1997 with its Geely Auto subsidiary. Geely Auto is currently the seventh largest automobile manufacturer in China, with 1.328 million sales in China in 2021. Globally, the group sold over 2.2 million cars in 2021, and over 17,926 plug-in electric vehicles in January 2022.

The company produces and sells vehicles under its own branding - such as Geely Auto, Geometry, Maple, and Zeekr - and under foreign-located subsidiaries - such as Volvo Cars, Polestar, Lynk & Co, Proton, and Lotus - as well as commercial only vehicles under the London EV Company, Ouling Auto and Farizon Auto brands. It also produces electric vehicles under some of the previously listed brandings, and motorcycles under its subsidiary Zhejiang Geely Ming Industrial (Jiming and Geely brands), Qianjiang Motorcycle (QJMotor and Keeway brands) and Benelli. The group acquired in September 2022 a 7.6% shareholding of Aston Martin Lagonda Global Holdings plc, the ultra-luxury British performance brand Aston Martin.

Overview
Geely is a phonetic transliteration of the company's native name , which means "auspicious" or "propitious" in Chinese.

Zhejiang Geely Holding Group was already manufacturing its own cars long before it acquired the Swedish passenger car maker Volvo Cars from Ford Motor Company in 2010. It completed the acquisition of British taxi maker London EV Company in 2013, and acquired a majority stake in British sports carmaker Lotus in 2017.

Zhejiang Geely Holding Group's business is divided into five sub-groups: Geely Auto Group which includes the brands Geely Auto, Lynk & Co, Proton, and Lotus; Volvo Car Group which includes the brands Volvo Cars and Polestar; Geely New Energy Commercial Vehicle Group which include the brands London Electric Vehicle Company and Yuan Cheng (Farizon); Geely Group (New Business) which includes the brands Caocao, Terrafugia, Qianjiang Motorcycle, Joma, and other new businesses; and Mitime Group which includes ZGH educational institutions, motorsports business, and tourism business. Zhejiang Geely Holding Group has global operations spanning the automotive value chain, from research, development and design to production, sales and service.

Geely Automobile Holdings Ltd, a subsidiary of Zhejiang Geely Holding Group, is listed on the Hong Kong Stock Exchange. On 13 February 2017, it became a constituent of the Hang Seng Index.

History 
Li Shufu founded Geely in 1986 as a refrigerator maker with money borrowed from family.

After the purchase of a failing, state-run firm, Geely manufactured motorcycles in the mid-1990s. Small van production began in 1998, and a year later, it received state approval to manufacture automobiles. Car production began in 2002. A subsidiary of the group, Geely Auto, had its IPO on the Stock Exchange of Hong Kong in 2004.

The company had a booth at the 2005 Frankfurt Motor Show, and a 2006 showing at the Detroit auto show.

Geely approached Ford in mid-2008 about a possible takeover of Volvo Cars. On October 28, 2009, it was named as the preferred buyer of Volvo by the American automaker. A deal was reached in late March and completed in early August, 2010.

In 2010, total sales of over 415,000 units gave the company a near 2% market share. Sales were lower than a reported 680,000 units per year production capacity.

In December 2011, it was announced that Geely would begin selling Chinese-designed and -manufactured cars in the United Kingdom at the end of 2012, with the first model to go on sale being the Emgrand EC7. The company has also stated its intention to begin sales in Italy.

In May 2017, Geely confirmed plans to purchase a 51% controlling-stake in Lotus Cars from its owner, DRB-HICOM (Proton). Additionally, Geely plans to purchase a 49.9% stake in PROTON Holdings, to facilitate future export growth in right-hand drive markets. The deals were seen as an important step for the Chinese carmaker in their quest to make inroads into the lucrative ASEAN region.

In July 2017 the company purchased Terrafugia, an American maker of flying cars. In November 2017, Geely announced completion of the Terrafugia acquisition, including approval from all relevant regulators.

In December 2017, Geely invested €3.25 billion into Swedish truck and construction company Volvo Group, a former parent company of Volvo Cars. The deal made Geely the biggest shareholder by number of shares with an 8.2% stake, and second by voting rights, with 15.6%.

In 2018, Geely purchased a 9.7% stake in Daimler AG, owner of the Mercedes-Benz and Smart brands.

In September 2019, Geely led a round of private funding for Volocopter that raised $55 million for the company. Volocopter's other private investors also include Daimler AG which owns a stake in the company.

In late July 2020, it was announced that the Xingma Group had agreed to transfer a 15.24% stake of its shares in the Ma'anshan-based heavy truck manufacturer Hualing Xingma to Geely New Energy Commercial Vehicle Group, a wholly owned subsidiary of Geely Holdings. After the transaction, Geely New Energy Commercial Vehicle Group would become the de facto controlling shareholder of Hualing Xingma.

In September 2020, Geely started talks with rival car manufacturers, including Daimler AG, to license a new architecture it developed for building electric cars. The new technology offers increased driving ranges of up to 700 km and lighter cars.

Geely is set to create an electric vehicle joint venture together with Baidu. Baidu would develop the electric car's software while Geely would manufacture the car itself.

On the 23 March 2021, Geely announced its Zeekr brand of electric vehicles brand to tap into China's growing demand for these vehicles. The first Zeekr model will be based on the Zero Concept car unveiled September 2020 by Geely-owned Lynk & Co. Geely expects to begin deliveries of Zeekr models in the third quarter of 2021.

In August 2021, Geely started a strategic partnership with Renault by forming a car production joint venture for China.  In January 2022, the two companies signed an agreement by which Renault's South Korean subsidiary Renault Korea Motors would produce vehicles based on Geely Compact Modular Architecture platform, initially intended for the domestic market. Production is set to start by 2024. In May 2022, Renault said a Geely subsidiary was set to acquire a 34.02% of Renault Korea Motors through capital increase as part of their partnership, although the company would continue to be majority owned by Renault and a consolidated subsidiary of it. In November 2022, Renault said it plans to spun off its powertrain production and development operations (including internal combustion engines and hybrid systems) into a joint venture company with Geely as co-owner. In March 2023, Aramco signed a letter of intent to join the powertrain joint venture.

During February 2023, Geely announced the group's official launch of a new range of electrical vehicle series product series. Geely also announced the new technologies used in there range and have stated the company plan to release seven Geely Galaxy vehicle models within the next two years.

Automotive divisions and products 
Based in China, Zhejiang Geely Holding Group operates all over the world through its many subsidiary brands. The Group's core business activities are within the automotive industry where it controls the following automotive groups and vehicle brands:

Many of Geely's early products were based on the Xiali, a variant of the 1987 Daihatsu Charade. Models such as the Haoqing (豪情) (five-door), Merrie (美日) (five-door), Uliou (优利欧) (four-door), and Urban Nanny (van and pick-up truck) have Charade bases, but feature a more prominent chromed grille.

Geely is known for imbuing a sense of humour in the names of some of their vehicles. One sedan is called the "King Kong", and an early model was named You Li Ou, a play on words that means "better than the Tianjin Xiali or the Buick Sail", two of its competitors.

Vehicle platforms 
Many of Geely's subsidiaries produce vehicles using shared architectures. Some examples include:
Volvo Scalable Product Architecture platform (SPA) - 2014–present
Compact Modular Architecture platform (CMA) - 2017–present
B-segment Modular Architecture platform (BMA) - 2018–present
Sustainable Experience Architecture platform (SEA) - 2021–present

Brands

Geely Auto 

Geely Auto is ZGH's original and mainstream brand, primarily sold in China and select overseas markets.

Benelli 

Benelli is a subsidiary that produces motorcycles and scooters. Design, development and marketing activities are carried out at the Benelli QJ headquarters in Pesaro, Italy, with production occurring in Wenling, China for sale globally.

Key models include:

 Benelli TNT 300
 Benelli TRK 502
 Benelli Leoncino 500

Farizon 
Yuan Cheng Auto or Farizon Auto was formed in 2016 to focus on the development of commercial vehicles in China and has launched several long range capable truck and bus solutions. Products include:

Farizon E200 and E200S –Light to medium-duty trucks.
Farizon E5 and E6 –Electric cargo and panel vans.
Farizon Xingxiang V –Electric cargo and panel vans.
Farizon FX – A pickup truck based on the Geely Boyue Pro SUV.

Galaxy (Geely Yinhe)

Geely Yinhe is Geely's upscale range of 'new energy vehicles' (hybrids and EVs) for the executuve market. Even though Yinhe translates as milky way, the global brand is being referred to as Galaxy by the company, with pure electric models to be launched under the Galaxy E brand. Six days after showing their Galaxy Light concept, Geely received notice from Changan Automobile that the design was too similar to one of their own cars.

Key models include: 
Galaxy L7 – a plug-in hybrid SUV, formally known as the K7
Galaxy L6 – a hybrid-powered sedan.
Galaxy Light – a concept car.

Geometry

Geometry is an electric-only range of Geely-based cars. 10 models are planned by 2025.

Key models include: 
Geometry A – all electric midsize sedan. 
 Geometry C – all electric compact crossover.

Jidu Auto 

Jidu Auto, a joint venture between Geely and Baidu, intends to release a full portfolio of electric vehicles in different segments starting in 2022.
Jidu ROBO-01 – all electric midsize crossover.
Jidu ROBO-02 – all electric midsize sedan.

LEVC

The London Taxi Company, which was acquired by Zhejiang Geely Holding Group in 2013, changed their name to London Electric Vehicle Company (LEVC) in 2017 to reflect their new mission of developing and producing electric commercial vehicles. With a new factory in Ansty, Coventry, they have begun production of a new generation of zero emission capable new taxi vehicle in late 2017.

Current products sold under the LEVC brand include:
 2017 – LEVC TX
 2020 – LEVC VN5

Lotus 

Owned 51% by Zhejiang Geely Holding Group and 49% by Etika Automotive. Lotus Cars is a British producer of sports and racing cars. The first Lotus car was built in 1948 and in June 2017, Lotus Cars became majority owned by Zhejiang Geely Holding Group.

Lynk & Co

Owned 50% by Geely Auto, 30% by Volvo Cars, and 20% by Zhejiang Geely Holding Group, Lynk & Co was formed in 2017. It is a Chinese-Swedish car brand based on technology developed jointly by Volvo Cars and Geely Auto.

Maple 

This brand name was affiliated with Shanghai Maple Automobile, a Geely subsidiary established in 1999 and phased out in 2010.

Products sold under the Maple NEV brand include:
 2020 – Maple 30X subcompact crossover SUV
 2020 – Maple 80V MPV
 2022 – Maple 60S (Geely's first battery swap car, produced in association with Lifan)

Polestar

Owned 50.5% by Zhejiang Geely Holding Group (or associated entities) and 49.5% by Volvo Cars. Polestar, a Swedish all-electric premium car brand, was previously part of Volvo Cars before being spun out into an independent entity.

Proton

Owned 49.9% by Zhejiang Geely Holding Group and 50.1% by DRB-Hicom and is managed by Geely Auto Group. Proton is the National Car Brand of Malaysia established in the 1980s at the behest of the government and later reverted to private ownership under DRB Hicom.

Radar
Radar is Geely's upscale pick-up truck brand, with its name standing for Rational, Alone, Discovery, Accompany, and Romantic.

The brands first vehicle, the RADAR RD6, was unveiled in 2022.

Volvo Cars

Owned 82% by Zhejiang Geely Holding Group (post Volvo Cars IPO). Zhejiang Geely Holding Group acquired Volvo Cars from Ford Motor Company in 2010.

Zeekr 

 Zeekr 001

Discontinued brands/ models
Geely has sold cars under at least three separate brands and may have continued to use the brand name of a purchased company for a short time. The Emgrand, Englon, and Gleagle names were phased out in 2014 alongside efforts to reduce sprawl, and the Shanghai Maple brand name was discontinued in 2010 and revived in 2020.

Previous Geely Auto products
 1998–2006 HQ/Haoqing/Haoqing SRV (豪情/豪情SRV) 1.0 L, 1.3 L & 1.5 L hatchback
 2001–2007 PU/Rural Nanny/Urban Nanny
 2003–2005 MR/Uliou/MS (优利欧)
 2003–2006 MR/Merrie (美日) hatchback
 2003–2006 BL/Beauty Leopard/BO (美人豹) 1.5 L coupe
2005–2009 Geely 美日之星 1.1 L & 1.3 L hatchback
 2005–2016 CK/Freedom Cruiser 1.3 L & 1.5 L & 1.6 L sedan
 2008–2011 Geely China Dragon (中国龙) 1.8 L CVVT coupe
2006–2020 MK/LG/KingKong (金刚) – 1.5 L & 1.6 L sedan (also called Micro Sedan in Sri Lanka)
2014–2017 Geely GX9

Previous Emgrand models 

Emgrand was launched in 2009 as a medium to high-end luxury brand. In 2014 Emgrand ceased to be a stand-alone brand, and Emgrand became a sub-brand of Geely, which itself adopted an updated version of the Emgrand logo.

Previous products sold under the Emgrand brand include:
 2009–2014 Emgrand EC7 1.8 L CVVT sedan/hatchback
 2010–2014 Emgrand EC8 2.0 L, 2.4 L sedan
 2010–2014 Emgrand EC7-RV 1.5L, 1.8L hatchback
 2011–2014 Emgrand EX7 SUV

Previous Maple models 
This brand name was affiliated with Shanghai Maple Automobile, a Geely subsidiary established in 1999. It was replaced by the Englon brand in 2010. The brand was revived as Geely's budget NEV brand as of 2020.

Previous products sold under the Shanghai Maple brand include:
 2003–2010 Maple Hisoon (海迅) AA & AB 5-door hatchback
 2003–2010 Maple Huapu (华普) M203 1.5 L 5-door hatchback
 2004–2010 Maple Marindo (海域) M303 1.5 L & 1.8 L sedan
 2005–2010 Maple Hysoul (海尚) M305 5-door hatchback
 2006–2010 Maple Hysoul (海尚) M206/Haixuan (海炫) car aimed specially at female consumers

Englon 
Launched in 2010 and replacing the Shanghai Maple brand, the company claimed Englon emulated classic, British style, and its model line included a TX4 sold on the Chinese market. Some of its cars were built by Geely subsidiary Shanghai LTI. As Geely fully acquired The London Taxi Company in 2013, the emblem of Englon also became the new logo of The London Taxi Company.
Englon SC3
Englon SC5-RV
Englon SC6
Englon SC7
Englon SC7-RV
Englon SX5
Englon SX7
Englon TX4

Gleagle 

Gleagle was an entry-level brand.

Some Gleagle cars, such as the Gleagle Panda, were available for sale on the Internet in China via the Taobao Mall, a popular e-commerce site. While Geely would deliver the car to the customer's address, buying one of the Panda models on offer did necessitate a trip to a traditional dealer.

Products sold under the Gleagle brand include:
 2008–2016 Gleagle Panda (熊猫) 1.0 L & 1.3 L CVVT hatchback, also known as the Geely LC
 2010 Gleagle GX2 (Panda Cross) 1.3 L & 1.5 L
 2011 Gleagle CK 1.0 L & 1.5 L, a rebadging of the Geely CK
 2012 Gleagle GC7 1.8 L four-door sedan
 2012 Gleagle GX7 compact SUV

Zhidou
Products sold till 2020 under the Zhidou Auto or ZD Auto brand included:
Zhidou D1
Zhidou D2
Zhidou D3

Geely Motorcycles 

Geely produced also motorcycle since 1994 with own subsidiry Geely Ming Industrial Co., with the brand Jiming and Geely Motorcycle.

Production facilities 

Headquartered in Hangzhou, Zhejiang, Geely has production bases in Lanzhou, Gansu (completed in 2006, Geely construction in the region continued as of August 2010 either for expanding the existing facility or for a new semi-complete knock-down factory); Xiangtan, Hunan; an unnamed location 40 minutes south of Shanghai; Jinan, Shandong; and at Linhai, Luqiao, and Ningbo in Zhejiang.

At least four overseas factories assemble Geely models probably from semi-complete or complete knock-down kits. Such facilities are or have been located in Indonesia, Sri Lanka (in collaboration with Micro Cars), Malaysia, Russia (assembly controlled by local firm Derways), Belarus (BelGee), Tunisia, and Ukraine. These locations are not necessarily affiliated with or owned by Geely.

Non-automotive subsidiaries

Geely Group (new business) 
CAOCAO – CAOCAO ride hailing service was developed by Hangzhou YouXing Technology Company and majority owned by Zhejiang Geely Holding Group. It is the first Chinese new energy focused mobility service.

Terrafugia – Terrafugia was founded in 2006. The company was acquired in full by Zhejiang Geely Holding Group in 2017.

Zhejiang Qianjiang Motorcycle Group Co – Qianjiang Motorcycle was majority acquired by Zhejiang Geely Holding Group in 2016. The company is one of the largest producers of motorcycles in China and own several renowned brands including Italy's Benelli. They are also known for their lithium battery technology.

Geespace plans to create a network of low earth orbit satellites that will send precise positioning information to self-driving cars.

Mitime Group 

Education – ZGH has invested hundreds of millions of RMB in establishing 9 universities and colleges across China, including the Geely University of China, University of Sanya, Xiangtan Institute of Technology, Sanya Institute of Technology, and Hunan Geely Automobile College. The wider group has over 40,000 students enrolled within its schools with the goal of developing Chinese automotive industry talents.

Motorsports – Mitime constructs and operates race tracks for automobiles, motorcycles, and karts around the world. Mitime also organizes motorsport events such as China F4 Championship.

Tourism – Mitime facilitates tourism and manages hospitality services around its tracks.

Drivetrain Systems International 
In 2009, Geely bought Drivetrain Systems International Pty Ltd, a global transmission developer headquartered in Australia.

Meizu 

In June 2022, Geely acquired a majority stake of Meizu, a Chinese consumer electronics manufacturer based in Zhuhai, Guangdong.

Dealer network
Geely refers to its dealer network as 4S stores and also sells some models online. In 2014, it had a reported 900 retail outlets.

Sales

Markets

In addition to China, Geely vehicles have been sold in Argentina, Australia, Bahrain, Brazil, Chile, Colombia, Costa Rica, Egypt, Indonesia, Iran, Kuwait, Nepal, New Zealand, Nigeria, Oman, Pakistan, the Philippines, Romania, Russia, Saudi Arabia, South Africa, Syria, Taiwan, Turkey, Ukraine, Uruguay, and Venezuela. In a number of markets, Geely vehicles are assembled in local factories from complete knock-down kits. Geely is also marketed in Lebanon, through the Rasamny Younes dealership network.

The Cuban government has purchased a considerable number of Geely vehicles, and they are used as police patrol cars or tourist taxis throughout Havana.

The Geely automobile brand was touted to be launched in the United Kingdom in late 2012. However, this plan was not pursued and the official website has been offline since mid-2014.

In July 2020 1st showroom opened in Doha, Qatar.

Figures
In 2010, Geely surpassed its 400,000-vehicle sales target goal for the first time selling 415,286 cars of its 680,000 units/year production capacity prompting the company to set its 2011 sales target at 480,000 cars, a 16% increase.

Geely Auto Group reported annual sales of 1,24 million cars in 2017, an increase of 63% from the previous year. Due to strong 2017 sales, Geely Auto Group has subsequently set its 2018 sales volume target to 1.58 million.

Geely Auto Group reported annual sales of 1,500,838 units in 2018. This year marks the first time that Geely Auto has reached sales of 1.5 million units.

Safety record
A small Geely sedan, the CK, performed badly in an informal crash test conducted by a Russian magazine in 2007. As a result, Geely reviewed its expansion plans. The Geely CK 1.3L in its most basic version for Latin America with no airbags received 0 stars for adult occupants and 2 stars for infants from Latin NCAP in 2010.

In 2010, the Geely LC scored 45.3 points of a possible 51 in the China-NCAP crash tests, making it China's first locally researched and developed mini car to be awarded a 5-star rating, and the safest Chinese hatchback as of 2011.

In 2011, the Geely Emgrand EC7 earned a 4-star rating in a Euro NCAP crash test. In 2015 the Geely Borui received 5 stars in C-NCAP crash testing.

Controversies
The 2009 Geely GE concept received criticism for looking like a Rolls-Royce.

An unsuccessful lawsuit was brought against the company in the early 2000s by Toyota, which claimed Geely had "implied in ads that some of the parts [used in Geely vehicles] were made by Toyota". Geely may also have previously used a logo that resembled that of Toyota.

In 2020, the Australian Strategic Policy Institute accused at least 82 major brands, including Geely, of being connected to forced Uyghur labor in Xinjiang.

See also
 Beijing Geely University – Private university located at Beijing founded by Geely 
 Geely University of China – Private university located at Chengdu founded by Geely
 University of Sanya – Private university located at Hainan endowed by Geely

References

External links
 Brands and companies of Geely 
 
 
Geely Global
Zhejiang Geely Holding Group website
Official Geely Motorcycles website

 
Motor vehicle manufacturers of China
Electric vehicle manufacturers of China
Car manufacturers of China
Manufacturing companies based in Hangzhou
Chinese companies established in 1986
Vehicle manufacturing companies established in 1986
Chinese brands
Multinational companies headquartered in China
Car brands
Luxury motor vehicle manufacturers
Publicly traded companies of China
Taizhou, Zhejiang
Motor vehicle engine manufacturers
Automotive transmission makers